Fugløya is an island in Gildeskål Municipality in Nordland county, Norway. The island has no permanent residents (as of 2016), but as recently as the 1960s, there were 124 residents living on the island. The island has several large bird colonies, including puffins. It lies in the Fugløyvær archipelago which includes about 140 small islands and this one large island.  

There were two main settlements on the island: Sør-Fugløy in the south and Nord-Fugløy in the north. Both are now used as vacation homes.  The islands of Fleina, Sørarnøya, Nordarnøya, and Sandhornøya lie several kilometers to the northeast.

Media gallery

See also
List of islands of Norway

References

Gildeskål
Islands of Nordland
Uninhabited islands of Norway